The killick hitch  is a type of hitch knot used to attach a rope to oddly shaped objects. This knot is also known as the kelleg hitch. It is a combination of a timber hitch tied in conjunction with a half hitch, which is added to lend support and stability when pulling or hoisting the object; the addition of a half-hitch in front of the timber hitch creates a timber hitch and a half hitch, known as a  killick hitch when at sea. A killick is "a small anchor or weight for mooring a boat, sometimes consisting of a stone secured by pieces of wood".

Use and history
The killick hitch is used to anchor small boats, usually by using some odd shaped heavy object. It is used by oystermen because
the anchor is more readily moved than with other methods.

See also
List of knots
List of hitch knots

References

External links